FabricLive.71 is a DJ mix album by English DJ, DJ EZ. The album was released as part of the FabricLive Mix Series.

Track listing

References

External links

FabricLive.71 at Fabric

Fabric (club) albums
2013 compilation albums